Ibrahim El-Shayeb (born on April 26, 1984) is an Egyptian football midfielder who plays for El-Ittihad. As of 2016, he is the team captain.

References

1984 births
Living people
Egyptian footballers
Al Ittihad Alexandria Club players
Association football midfielders